Ottorino Aloisio (16 March 1902 – 24 January 1986) was an Italian architect. His work was part of the architecture event in the art competition at the 1928 Summer Olympics.

References

External links
 

1902 births
1986 deaths
20th-century Italian architects
Olympic competitors in art competitions
People from Udine